Real Emotion is the third full-length studio album by Paper Route, released on September 23, 2016. The song "Chariots" was featured on the soundtrack for EA Sports game FIFA 17 and was used as the exclusive gameplay trailer track. "Writing on the Wall" is featured on the soundtrack for NBA 2K17.
On February 2, 2017, Paper Route made their late night TV debut, performing their newest single, "Balconies," on NBC's Late Night with Seth Meyers.

Track listing

Personnel
Paper Route
JT Daly
Chad Howat
Nick Aranda

Studio Musicians
Darren King (drums: tracks 2, 4, 9, 14, 16)
London Community Gospel Choir (choir vocals: tracks 1, 5, 8)
Joel Plotnik (drums: track 3)
Scott Soifer (drums: track 7)
Jordan Meredith Daly (additional vocals: track 15)

Production
Paper Route - production, engineering, mixing, programming
Joe LaPorta - mastering
Tony Hoffer - mixing (tracks 2, 4, 14)
Robert Marvin - production, mixing, engineering 
Darrell Thorp - engineering
Luke Vander Pol - engineering
Jonny MacIntosh - engineering
Michael Brauer at Electric Lady Studios - mixing (tracks 5, 9)
Manny Marroquin at Larrabee Studios - mixing (tracks 8, 12)
Allister Ann - Photography
Micah Bell - Album Packaging

References

2016 albums
Paper Route (band) albums
Kemosabe Records albums